The Connecticut State Bar Association (CBA) is a voluntary bar association for the state of Connecticut.

History
The CBA was founded on June 2, 1875.

In 1878, members of CBA met in Saratoga Springs, New York, to lead in founding the national bar association; out of this grew the American Bar Association.

The Connecticut Bar Association is governed by a Board of Governors, an administrative board with responsibility for budgetary and financial matters other than setting annual dues, and a House of Delegates, its primary decision-making and policy-making body. Seven offices, held by members of the Association for one-year terms, include president, immediate past president, president-elect, vice president, secretary, treasurer, and assistant secretary-treasurer.

CBA does not regulate admission to the practice of law in Connecticut; that is the function of the Connecticut Bar Examining Committee of the Connecticut Judicial Branch.

References

American state bar associations
Organizations established in 1875
1875 establishments in Connecticut